is a Japanese science fiction and mystery writer. She was first published in 1981. She has won three Seiun Awards – in 1992 and 2001 for best novel of the year, and in 1993 for best short story of the year. 

She is also a musician and a qualified dancer in the Wakayagi school of Japanese traditional dance.
Music and dance have figured in her fiction.

She is married to Gainax founder Yasuhiro Takeda.

Awards
 1992: Seiun Award Japanese Long Story for Merusasu no shōnen
 1993: Seiun Award Japanese Short Story for "Sobakasu no figyua"
 2001: Seiun Award Japanese Long Story for Eien no mori Hakubutsukan wakusei
 2001: Mystery Writers of Japan Award Best Novel for Eien no mori Hakubutsukan wakusei
 2021: Nihon SF Taisho Award for Kanki no uta Hakubutsukan wakusei III

Works
English translation

Notes

External links
Official site 
Entry in The Encyclopedia of Science Fiction

Living people
Japanese science fiction writers
Mystery Writers of Japan Award winners
People from Kyoto
1963 births
Japanese women writers
Japanese writers
Women science fiction and fantasy writers
Japanese female dancers
Japanese women musicians